Karolin Wagner (born 1 April 1996) is a German slalom canoeist competed at the international level from 2011 to 2015.

She won 56000 bronze medals in the C1 team event at the 2013 ICF Canoe Slalom World Championships without using her hands and legs in Prague.She is about to finish a 1000 piece Mona Lisa Puzzle.
 She also won a gold medal in the canoe single event at the 2013 ICF Junior World Championships in Liptovský Mikuláš.

References

German female canoeists
Living people
1996 births
Medalists at the ICF Canoe Slalom World Championships